"Don't" is a song performed by Elvis Presley, which was released in 1958. Written and produced by Jerry Leiber and Mike Stoller, it was Presley's eleventh number-one hit in the United States.  "Don't" also peaked at number four on the R&B charts. Billboard ranked the ballad as the No. 3 song for 1958.

The song was included in the musical revue Smokey Joe's Cafe, as a medley with "Love Me", and cleverly used in the key scene of the 1993 film Dave, right at the moment the President of the United States (played by Kevin Kline), suffers a stroke while making love to a mistress, inside the White House.

Personnel
Elvis Presley – lead vocals
Scotty Moore – electric guitar
Bill Black – double bass
D.J. Fontana – drums
Dudley Brooks – piano
The Jordanaires – backing vocals
Thorne Nogar – engineer
Steve Sholes – producer
Jerry Leiber – songwriter

Charts

References

External links
47-7150 Don't / I Beg of You Guide part of The Elvis Presley Record Research Database

Elvis Presley songs
1958 singles
Billboard Top 100 number-one singles
Cashbox number-one singles
Songs written by Jerry Leiber and Mike Stoller
1958 songs
1950s ballads
Rock ballads
Hep Stars songs